Charles Lawrence "Larry" Woodall (July 26, 1894 – May 16, 1963) was a professional baseball player. He played ten seasons in Major League Baseball, all in the American League with the Detroit Tigers (1920–1929), primarily as a catcher.

Life
Born in Staunton, Virginia, he attended Wake Forest University and the University of North Carolina.

Career
During most of Woodall's playing career, he played behind two starting catchers of the Tigers, Johnny Bassler and Oscar Stanage. For one season in 1927, however, he played a career-high 86 games at catcher during manager George Moriarty's first season. Woodall posted a .997 fielding percentage (committing one error), the best percentage among all starting catchers that season. He hit over .300 in three seasons and had a career batting average of .268 in 548 games. Woodall batted and threw right-handed.

After his major league career was over, Woodall spent ten seasons in the Pacific Coast League. In 1930–31, he played for the Portland Beavers, including a stint as player-manager in 1930. He moved on to the Sacramento Senators in 1932–33, then put in six seasons with the San Francisco Seals from 1934 to 1939.

Woodall's post-playing career included more than two decades with the Boston Red Sox, as a coach (1942–1948, including service on Boston's 1946 pennant-winning team), director of public relations, and scout. In 1949, he scouted Willie Mays but reported that Mays "was not the Red Sox' type of player." Woodall remained a Red Sox employee until his death at age 68 in Cambridge, Massachusetts.

See also
 List of Major League Baseball players who spent their entire career with one franchise

References

External links

1894 births
1963 deaths
Asheville Tourists players
Baseball players from Virginia
Boston Red Sox coaches
Boston Red Sox scouts
Detroit Tigers players
Fort Worth Panthers players
Major League Baseball bullpen coaches
Major League Baseball catchers
North Carolina Tar Heels baseball players
People from Staunton, Virginia
Portland Beavers managers
Portland Beavers players
Sacramento Senators players
San Francisco Seals (baseball) players
Toledo Mud Hens players
Wake Forest Demon Deacons baseball players